Garden Lodge at Logan Place in Kensington, London W8 is a detached house that was built from 1908–09 for the painter Cecil Rae and his wife, the sculptor Constance Halford. The house has had several notable inhabitants since Rae including Peter Wilson, the chairman of Sotheby's auction house, and was the last residence of the singer and songwriter Freddie Mercury from 1980 until his death at the house in 1991.

Description
The house was designed by the architect Ernest William Marshall and built in the Neo-Georgian style. It is two-storeys high with 8 bedrooms, and a pedimented studio wing with a large bay window as a notable feature. The builders were M. Calnan and Son of Commercial Road. It is set in an acre of landscaped grounds. An 8 ft high wall surrounds the garden with a dark glass door set into it that provides an entrance. The wall has been adorned with graffiti and messages from fans of Mercury since his death.

Occupants
Cecil Rae occupied the house from its completion until his death in 1935. His wife Constance survived him and lived there until her death in 1938. The British intelligence operative Tomás Harris and his wife Hilda moved to the house during the Second World War and hosted many MI5 and SIS employees at the property.

Freddie Mercury bought the house for £500,000 in cash from a member of the Hoare family early in 1980. After his death, mourning fans covered the wall with graffiti messages. In 2017 the owner and close friend of Mercury, Mary Austin had the shrine cleared.

Bridget Cherry, writing in the 1991 London: North West edition of the Pevsner Architectural Guides described the house as "well hidden".

References

Georgian Revival architecture in the United Kingdom
Houses in the Royal Borough of Kensington and Chelsea
Houses completed in 1909